St. Malachy Roman Catholic Church is a parish church of the Roman Catholic Archdiocese of New York, located in Manhattan on West 49th Street, between Broadway and Eighth Avenue. The parish has served the theatre community in a special way since 1920, and its parishioners have included many actors, such as Bob Hope and Gregory Peck.

Founding
The parish was founded in 1902 by Archbishop Farley, with the Rev. William Daly being named the first pastor. Services were soon being held in a basement sanctuary. The current church complex was designed by prolific ecclesiastical architect, Thomas J. Duff, and built the following year.

The Actors' Parish
Around 1920 the Theater District started to move uptown into this area, and actors, dancers, and musicians became prominent worshipers at the church, replacing the traditional, working class congregants. To answer their needs, the pastor, Monsignor Edward F. Leonard, had the Chapel of St. Genesius, the patron saint of actors – commonly called the "Actors' Chapel" – constructed below the main church in 1920. He sought the special permission of the Archbishop of New York for Masses to be celebrated there at 4 A.M. (which was banned by canon law at the time) to accommodate the non-standard schedules of theater workers and thus make worship convenient for them.

St. Malachy soon became a primary place of worship for the entertainment community. It gained worldwide attention when the church was the setting for the funeral of Rudolph Valentino, as well as of the wedding of Douglas Fairbanks Jr. to Joan Crawford. Celebrity worshipers were often in attendance, as well as theater goers, and the nearby location of Madison Square Garden during that time helped to provide a steady stream of visitors. Until the late 1960s average monthly attendance at Sunday services totaled some 16,000 people. The church's chimes would play "There's No Business Like Show Business."

Changing neighborhoods
By 1968, the neighborhood was undergoing a drastic change as the theatre community started to move out and the area became home to a community plagued by poverty and drugs. Madison Square Garden moved away. Most who stayed were elderly and poor. Many were held virtually under siege in decaying single room occupancy hotels or in tenements with a tub in the kitchen and a shared bathroom in the hallway.

Msgr. Thomas J. O'Brien was brought from a parish in the South Bronx to help deal with the new realities of the neighborhood. He was succeeded by the Rev. George W. Moore in 1976, who created a new model of pastoral outreach. Under his pastorate, the church "expanded its mission to the elderly, poor, homeless, and home-bound." In 1991, after 25 years as pastor, Moore was awarded a Tony Honors for Excellence in Theatre for his service to the elderly of the theater district. He received it shortly before his death from cancer.

List of pastors
The Rev. William G. B. Daly (1902–1906)
The Rt. Rev. Msgr. Joseph Francis Delany (1906–1917)
The Rev. Lawrence E. Murray III (1917–1920)
The Very Rev. Msgr. Edward F. Leonard (1920–1937)
The Rt. Rev. Msgr. James B. O'Reilly (1941–1960)
The Rev. Msgr. Thomas J. O'Brien (1966–1976)
The Rev. George W. Moore (1976–1991)
The Rev. Michael C. Crimmins (1991–2001)
The Rev. Erno Diaz (2001–2003)
The Rev. Richard D. Baker (2003–2015)
The Rev. Peter M. Colapietro (2015–2018)
The Rev. John Fraser (2018-) Parish Administrator

Notable ceremonies
Douglas Fairbanks, Jr., married Joan Crawford
Walter O'Malley married Katherine Hanson
Rudolph Valentino's funeral
Tennessee Williams' funeral
Bunny Berigan's funeral

Celebrity worshipers
Fred Allen
Don Ameche
George M. Cohan
Perry Como
Irene Dunne
Jimmy Durante, who grew up as a parishioner and served as altar boy there
Chris Farley
Alec Guinness
Florence Henderson.
Hildegarde
Bob Hope
Ricardo Montalbán
Pat O'Brien
Carroll O'Connor
Gregory Peck
Cyril Ritchard
Rosalind Russell
Elaine Stritch
Danny Thomas
Spencer Tracy

References

External links
Official parish website

Roman Catholic churches in Manhattan
Midtown Manhattan
Irish-American culture in New York City
Roman Catholic churches completed in 1920
Roman Catholic Archdiocese of New York
Gothic Revival church buildings in New York City
20th-century Roman Catholic church buildings in the United States